Tui Katoa (born 27 April 1999) is a Tonga international rugby league footballer who plays on the  for North Sydney Bears in the NSW Cup.

He previously played for the Canterbury-Bankstown Bulldogs in the NRL.

Background
Katoa was born in Hamilton, New Zealand and is of Tongan descent. Katoa is the younger brother of Cronulla-Sutherland Sharks player, Sione.

He played his junior rugby league for the Chester Hill Hornets before being signed by the Canterbury-Bankstown Bulldogs.

Playing career
Katoa played for the Canterbury-Bankstown junior sides from 2015 to 2018.

2019
Katoa spent the 2019 season primarily playing in the Canterbury Cup NSW as well as the Jersey Flegg Cup. He was selected to represent the New South Wales Under-20's in a 36–10 win. At the end of the season, Katoa was named in the 16-man Tongan World Nines squad.

2020
In round 20 of the 2020 NRL season, Katoa made his debut for Canterbury-Bankstown against the Penrith Panthers, coming off the bench for 55 minutes in a 42–0 loss.

2021
Katoa made a total of 11 appearances for Canterbury in the 2021 NRL season as the club finished last and claimed the Wooden Spoon.

References

External links
NRL profile

1999 births
Living people
New Zealand rugby league players
New Zealand sportspeople of Tongan descent
Canterbury-Bankstown Bulldogs players
Rugby league players from Hamilton, New Zealand
Rugby league wingers